Heartleap is the third studio album by Vashti Bunyan, released on October 6, 2014, in the UK on FatCat Records and October 7 in the U.S. via DiCristina. First announced in June, Heartleap was accompanied by a statement where Bunyan wrote, "The whole point of the album was finally to learn a way that would enable me to record the music that is in my head, by myself. I neither read nor write music, nor can I play piano with more than one hand at a time, but I have loved being able to work it all out for myself and make it sound the way I wanted. I've built these songs over years. The album wouldn't have happened any other way."

Track listing
All songs written, arranged and produced by Vashti Bunyan, except arrangement of strings in "Across the Water", improvised by Fiona Brice and Ian Burdge.

Personnel

Vashti Bunyan - Guitars, synth, producer, vocals, arrangements, piano, dulcitone
Martin Korth - Mixing
Mandy Parnell - Mastering
Whyn Lewis - Cover painting
dlt - Design and layout
Fiona Brice - Strings, violin
Ian Burdge - Strings, cello
Gillon Cameron - Strings, violin
Jo Mango - Kalimba, flute
Gareth Dickson - Guitars
Andy Cabic - Guitars, vocals
Devendra Banhart - Vocals
Ian Wilson - Recorder, saxophone

References

External links
 http://www.fat-cat.co.uk/site/artists/vashti-bunyan 

Vashti Bunyan albums
2014 albums
FatCat Records albums